Donald Graves could refer to: 

Donald Graves (Kremlinologist) (1929–2008), U.S. State Department analyst
Donald H. Graves (1930–2010), American author and educator 
Donald Graves (historian) (born 1949), Canadian military historian

See also
Don Graves, American banker and government official